Noon's Hole (Irish grid ref H12684431) lies about 5 km northwest of the centre of Boho, in the townland of Old Barr in the parish of Devenish, County Fermanagh, close to the border with Boho parish. The cave is under part of the escarpment on the east side of the Glenade Sandstone uplands.

Noon's Hole was previously called "Sumera", meaning "abyss", but gained notoriety and a new name in the 1820s, following the notorious murder of Dominick Noone, whose body was thrown into the cave. Ordnance Survey maps still use both names.

Exploration 
A Sumera is a bottomless pit, and locals initially treated Noon's Hole as a supernatural area, viewing it with suspicion and fear. It was not until 1912 that a group called the Yorkshire Ramblers reached the bottom. All they found at the bottom was a short passage leading to a sump. In January 1970 a group from the University of Leeds Speleological Association investigated the parallel shafts, and found that one led into  of passages they named the After-Noon Series.

In the meanwhile, cave divers had been pushing in Arch Cave from which the water from Noon's Hole resurges. In 1972 Martyn Farr and Roger Solari passed an  sump into a long canal, and then a  sump into a major extension which extended into the mountain for a further  to a third sump. The pair returned in 1973, and after a  dive they emerged into the After-Noon series of Noon's Hole.

Easter 1975 a party followed a draught in the After-Noon series through a rocky crawl, to break out into a mile of new passage which included a streamway, the terminal sump of which corresponded to a sump with the main water flow in Arch II cave. This was named the High Noon Series. In 1984, a group managed to find a dry connection between High Noon and Arch II cave to create the 'finest sporting trip in County Fermanagh'.

Dominick Noone 
Dominick Noone was originally from the Ballinamore area in the east of County Leitrim. Whilst in Derrygonnelly, he became a member of an illegal Catholic organisation known as the Ribbonmen, an agrarian reform group, but subsequently became an informer for the British Crown. It was on his evidence in 1826 that a number of fellow members were 'transported' to Australia. Despite police protection, he was invited to a wedding party, but then kidnapped and murdered and his body thrown down into the depths of the Sumera. The authorities suspected that his body lay in the shaft, and a man named Cavanagh from Castlecoole, a townland on the outskirts of Enniskillen, accepted a substantial reward to descend the shaft in a rope and creel. The body was then carried to a chapel for a wake but local people blocked the doorway preventing entrance. The murderers of Noone were never caught despite the offer of a £100 award.

In 1879 a long ballad was composed about the event. The penultimate verse goes:
Within the mountain nature made,
A deep and dismal cave,
That suited well the murderers said,
To be a traitor's grave,
They flung the lifeless body below -
A groan they thought it gave.

See also 
 Caves of the Tullybrack and Belmore hills
 List of caves in the United Kingdom

Notes

Further reading 
 
 

Limestone caves
Caves of Northern Ireland
Landforms of County Fermanagh